"Need to Feel Loved" is the debut single of English electronic music duo Reflekt featuring English singer Delline Bass on vocals. It was released in December 2004 and reached number 14 on the UK Singles Chart and number one on the UK Dance Singles Chart in March 2005.

Background
The song samples "Ghosts", part of the soundtrack to the 2002 film Road to Perdition and was featured in the 2005 British-Canadian film It's All Gone Pete Tong.

Track listings
UK CD single
 "Need to Feel Loved" (radio edit) – 3:15
 "Need to Feel Loved" (12-inch club mix) – 7:25
 "Need to Feel Loved" (Seb Fontaine and Jay P's Type Remix) – 8:30
 "Need to Feel Loved" (Thrillseekers Remix) – 8:11
 "Need to Feel Loved" (Fuzzy Hair vocal mix) – 6:26
 "Need to Feel Loved" (Horizontal Mix) – 5:30

Charts

Certifications

References

2005 debut singles
2005 songs
Positiva Records singles